Shanuka Dissanayake (born 10 May 1977) is a Sri Lankan first-class cricketer who plays for Sri Lanka Ports Authority Cricket Club.

References

External links
 

1977 births
Living people
Sri Lankan cricketers
Sri Lanka Ports Authority Cricket Club cricketers
People from Ragama